The District Court is the intermediate court system in Hong Kong, having limited criminal and civil jurisdictions.  The District Court was established in 1953 with the enactment of the District Court Ordinance. It is located in the Wanchai Law Courts, Wanchai Tower, 12 Harbour Road. In the past there were six district courts, namely Victoria, Kowloon, Fanling, Tsuen Wan, Tuen Mun and Sha Tin, before being amalgamated and moved to the same location

Jurisdiction

Civil jurisdiction 
The District Court has limited civil jurisdiction. For a contract, quasi-contract or tort claim to be handled by the District Court, it should be for an amount over HK$75,000 but not more than HK$3 million. If the claim is more than HK$3 million, the claim can still be pursued in the District Court (instead of the Court of First Instance of the High Court) provided that the excess is abandoned. If the claim is HK$75,000 or less, an adverse costs order may be made against the winning plaintiff due to pursuing its claim in the wrong court.

If the plaintiff's claim does not exceed HK$3 million, but the defendant counterclaims for over HK$3 million, the claim and the counterclaim (or the counterclaim only) may be transferred to the Court of First Instance of the High Court. For good reasons, the District Court may continue to handle the whole case even when the counterclaim exceeds HK$3 million, but a report has to be made to the High Court, which may order that the case be transferred.

As to claims for possession of land, the District Court can deal with buildings or premises the annual rent or rateable value or the annual value of which does not exceed HK$320,000.

If a claimant invokes the District Court's equity jurisdiction, the above limits are equally applicable, except that in proceedings wholly relating to land, the maximum value shall not exceed HK$7 million.

Distraint claims are handled by the District Court.

The District Court has exclusive jurisdiction to determine claims for compensation payable under the Employees' Compensation Ordinance (Cap. 282), regardless of the amount. Such claims are governed by the Employees' Compensation (Rules of Court) Rules (Cap. 282B) and Practice Direction 18.2.

The District Court has exclusive jurisdiction to deal with claims made under the Sex Discrimination Ordinance (Cap. 480), the Disability Discrimination Ordinance (Cap. 487), the Family Status Discrimination Ordinance (Cap. 527) and the Race Discrimination Ordinance (Cap. 602). Such claims are governed by the District Court Equal Opportunities Rules (Cap. 336G) and Practice Direction SL8.

The District Court has jurisdiction to handle claims by the Inland Revenue Department against defaulting taxpayers to recover outstanding tax due to the Government, regardless of the amount. The District Court also hears appeals from taxpayers against assessments by the Collector of Stamp Duty.

Criminal jurisdiction 
The system is modelled after the English legal system, with indictable offences being taken up by the District Court if they are transferred from the magistrate's court. 

The District Court hears all serious cases except murder, manslaughter rape and dangerous drug cases where large quantities of drugs have been seized, and can impose a sentence of up to seven years.  Cases are heard in either the Cantonese or English language.

A District Court Judge sits alone without a jury. From its establishment in 1953 there have been no juries in the district court.  The Attorney General at the time the District Court Ordinance was passed, Arthur Ridehalgh, explained to the Legislative Council that juries were "not infallible" and only a "means to an end" and that every practitioner will have come across cases where a verdict of not guilty was either a "stupid or perverse one."  Judges would be required to give reasons for verdict would should be sufficient safeguard.

Composition

Eligibility and appointment 

A person who has practised for at least 5 years as a barrister, advocate, solicitor or judicial officer in Hong Kong or another common law jurisdiction is eligible to be appointed as a Judge, Registrar or Master of the District Court.

District Judges, as well as the Registrar and Masters of the District Court, are appointed by the Chief Executive on the recommendation of the independent Judicial Officers Recommendation Commission (JORC).

Limited-term or vacancy-filling Deputy District Judges may be appointed by the Chief Justice.

It is not uncommon for a person to sit as a short-term Deputy District Judge prior to appointment in a permanent capacity.

In 1986, Judge Helen Lo was the first woman to be appointed as a District Judge.

District judges are mandated to retire at age 65.

Chief District Judge 
The Chief District Judge is the Court Leader of the District Court.

The Judges who have held the position of Chief District Judge to date are:

District Judges 

District Judges are referred to as 'His/Her Honour Judge [surname]'.

The Judges of the District Court  are (ranked by seniority):

Chief District Judge
 Justin Ko

District Judges
 Michael Wong
 Stanley Chan
 Simon Leung
 Sharon Melloy
 Eddie Yip
 Katina Levy
 C K Chan (Principal Family Court Judge)
 Frankie Yiu
 K W Wong
 Douglas Yau
 W K Kwok
 Josiah Lam
 Anthony Kwok
 Amanda Woodcock
 K H Hui
 Jack Wong
 Katherine Lo
 Gary Lam
 Andrew Li
 Herbert Au-Yeung
 Harold Leong
 Kent Yee
 C P Pang
 Simon Lo
 Isaac Tam
 Angela Kot
 Reuden Lai
 George Own
 Grace Chan
 L W Wong
 M K Liu
 Edmond Lee
 Winnie Tsui
 Clement Lee
 Ernest Lin
 Adriana Tse Ching
 K K Pang
 K C Chan
 Phoebe Man
 Lily Wong
 Kathie Cheung
 Thelma Kwan
 Jonathan Wong
 Elaine Liu
 Dick Ho

Pursuant to a general power of appointment to vacancies or on a temporary basis under sections 10 and 37A of the High Court Ordinance, Cap. 4, the Chief Justice frequently makes short-term appointments of District Court judges to sit in the High Court as a Deputy Judge or Master.

All District Judges are, by virtue of their office, Presiding Officers of the Lands Tribunal. In practice, however, only certain District Judges are assigned to hear cases in the Lands Tribunal.

Deputy District Judges 

The Chief Justice appoints on a temporary basis a number of Permanent Magistrates, retired judges and practitioners in private practice to sit as Deputy District Judges. A Deputy District Judge may exercise all the jurisdiction, powers and privileges of a District Judge.

All Deputy District Judges are, by virtue of their office, Presiding Officers of the Lands Tribunal. In practice, however, only certain Deputy District Judges are assigned to hear cases in the Lands Tribunal.

Forms of address 

All Judges of the District Court (regardless of whether Chief District Judge, Judges or Deputy Judges) are addressed in court as "Your Honour".

In court judgments and decisions, District Judges are referred to as 'His/Her Honour Judge [surname]', 'HH Judge [surname]' or 'HHJ [surname]'. Deputy District Judges are referred to as 'Deputy District Judge [surname]' or 'DDJ [surname]'.

See also 

 Judiciary of Hong Kong

Notes

References

External links 
 Hong Kong Court Services and Facilities - information about the District Court.

Judiciary of Hong Kong
1997 establishments in Hong Kong
Courts and tribunals established in 1997